A Day at the Zoo is a 1939 Warner Bros. Merrie Melodies cartoon supervised by Tex Avery. The short was produced in 1938 and released on March 11, 1939 and features an early version of Elmer Fudd.

Plot
This is one of the cartoons that Warner Bros. would occasionally produce in the late 1930s and early 1940s that was centered around a series of gags, usually based on outrageous stereotypes, plays on words, and topical references, as a narrator describes the action in a rapid-fire succession of anthropomorphic behavior, pun gags, or any combination thereof.

In this cartoon, the unifying thread is a visit to the zoo and the various animals therein: a wolf in his natural habitat (standing next to a door, a play on the phrase "wolves at the door"), a pack of camels (smoking Camels), a North American Greyhound (the bus line, not the dog breed), "two bucks..." (white-tailed deer) "...and five (s)cents" (five skunks), two friendly Elks, monkeys who toss peanuts to their spectators, a baboon that convinces the zookeeper to switch the baboon's place with a similar-looking human onlooker, a monkey that scolds an old lady for defying the order not to feed the monkeys, a groundhog (and his separately housed shadow), another skunk gag in which the skunk (with its onlookers in a circle a considerable distance away) is seen reading How to Win Friends and Influence People, a giraffe that is fed its meal of corn by way of a ladder, white rabbits that "multiply" via adding machines, an owl (and the predictable "hoo/Who" gag), a "South African talking parrot" that eschews crackers for "a short beer," an "Alcatraz jailbird" who insists he is innocent alongside a stool pigeon that insists the jailbird is guilty, an ostrich laying a large egg that, when she stumbles after tripping over a bucket, cracks and reveals a box of a dozen chicken eggs, an elephant new to the zoo without his trunk because it got lost in luggage on the way there, pink elephants left over from last year's New Year party, two panthers pacing their cage repeating the words bread and butter to each other, a former circus performer reading a newspaper who, it is revealed, used to "thrill audiences" by putting his head into a lion's mouth (as he puts the newspaper down and walks off, it is clear that a lion bit off his head), and a Rocky Mountain wildcat, gone wild because he had won a sweepstakes on "bank night" (a lottery game franchise that ran during the Depression years); but he had not been present when his name was drawn and therefore could not claim the prize.

The running gag in this cartoon involves an early prototype of Elmer Fudd, who is repeatedly seen taunting a lion in its cage. The narrator repeatedly warns him to stop; each time this occurs Elmer shies away and admits (in a Lou Costello impersonation) "I'm a ba-a-ad boy", but he always returns to his taunting. In the end, the lion is seen at peace; when the narrator presumes Elmer learned to leave the lion alone, the lion shakes his head in disagreement, opening his mouth to reveal his tormentor swallowed whole.

Notes
A remake/sequel, Who's Who in the Zoo, would follow in 1942, with Porky Pig as the zookeeper.
The final scene in this cartoon would be alluded to a decade later in Hare Do, in which Elmer Fudd (who evolved from his first earliest derby hatted and squinty-eyed Prototype) is swallowed up by a lion as part of the closing gag. Prototype-Elmer's next cartoon, Believe It or Else, is a parody of Ripley's Believe It or Not!
Through eBay auctions in 2007, the original titles have been found for the cartoon, but it is unknown if they have been acquired for future video releases.
This cartoon's 28-year copyright period in the United States expired in 1967 due to United Artists, the copyright owners to the pre-1948 cartoons at the time, failing to renew the copyright in time.

See also
 Looney Tunes and Merrie Melodies filmography (1929–1939)
 List of films in the public domain in the United States

References

External links

1939 films
1939 animated films
1939 comedy films
Films about monkeys
Animated films about elephants
Animated films about lions
Animated films about wolves
Animated films about birds
Films set in zoos
Films directed by Tex Avery
Elmer Fudd films
Merrie Melodies short films
Articles containing video clips
Films scored by Carl Stalling
1930s Warner Bros. animated short films
1930s English-language films